is a Japanese anime television series produced by animation studio Fanworks. This series started airing from January 6, 2021 to March 24, 2021.

Plot 
This is a story about an unidentified animal called ABCiee. He always wanted to work in a TV station. When he finally started working in a TV station, he faces a lot of problems and challenges in his way. Despite having these problems, he takes them head on with his positivity.

Cast 
Abciee

Kawauso-chan

Koi-san

Yago Otoko

Zarigani-senpai

References

External links 
Official website

2021 anime television series debuts
Fanworks (animation studio)
Animated television series about animals
Crunchyroll anime
Medialink